The 1837 Michigan gubernatorial election was held from November 6, 1837 to November 7, 1837. Incumbent Democrat Stevens T. Mason defeated Whig nominee Charles C. Trowbridge with 51.29% of the vote.

General election

Candidates
Major party candidates
Stevens T. Mason, Democratic 
Charles C. Trowbridge, Whig

Results

References

1837
Michigan
Gubernatorial
November 1837 events